The National Museum of Korean Contemporary History (대한민국역사박물관), opened on December 26, 2012, is dedicated to researching, preserving, and exhibiting the modern and contemporary history of the Republic of Korea. The museum features four permanent exhibition halls which cover the period from the late 19th century to the present, with the themes of "Prelude to the Republic of Korea", "Foundation of the Republic of Korea", "Development of the Republic of Korea", and "Modernization and Korea's Vision of Future".

The museum includes a children’s museum and a special exhibition gallery which enables visitors to explore modern and contemporary Korean history through various themes and topics. It also offers education programs and cultural events.

The museum is located near Gyeongbok Palace in what was formerly the north building for USAID. Admission is free.

History
2008-08-15: President declares plan to construct a museum on Korean modern history on Liberation Day speech
2009-02-11: Regulation enacted for the creation of a committee for the "National Museum of the Republic of Korea"
2009-04-16: Establishment of the Committee for the National Museum of the Republic of Korea
2009-05-04: Establishment of the Committee for the Founding of the National Museum of the Republic of Korea
2009-10-19: Name changed to "The National Museum of Korean Contemporary History"
2010-11-25: Museum's groundbreaking ceremony held
2012-05-23: Construction of the Museum completed
2012-09-01: Museum administration established
2012-12-17: Kim Wang-Sik takes office as the inaugural director
2012-12-26: Museum opens
2014-02-17: Museum's Education & Communication Division split into the Cultural Relations & Publicity Division and the Education Division
2015-07-20: Museum administratively reorganizes, establishing the Chief Curator’s Office, renaming the Planning & General Affairs Division to the General Administration Division, and renaming the Research Division to the Research & Planning Division
2015-12-03: Extensions open for Special Exhibition Halls 1 and 2
2016-01-25: Kim Yong-Jick inaugurated as the 2nd Director
2017-11-01: Chu Chin-Oh inaugurated as the 3rd Director

External links
 National Museum of Korean Contemporary History - official site

History museums in South Korea
Museums in Seoul
Museums established in 2012
2012 establishments in South Korea